Wheatlands is a rural locality in the South Burnett Region, Queensland, Australia.

Geography 
Barambah Creek forms the northern and eastern boundaries of the locality.

History 
Wheatlands State School opened on 17 November 1913.

Education 
Wheatlands State School is a government primary (Prep-6) school for boys and girls at 422 Byee Road. In 2018, the school had an enrolment of 75 students with 7 teachers (5 full-time equivalent) and 5 non-teaching staff (3 full-time equivalent).

References 

South Burnett Region
Localities in Queensland